The Boston mayoral election of 1855 saw the election of Alexander H. Rice.

This was an early victory for a young Republican Party.

Results

See also
List of mayors of Boston, Massachusetts

References

Mayoral elections in Boston
Boston
Boston mayoral
19th century in Boston